The Music City Miracle was an American football play that took place on January 8, 2000, during the National Football League's (NFL) 1999–2000 playoffs. It occurred at the end of the American Football Conference (AFC) Wild Card playoff game between the Tennessee Titans and Buffalo Bills at Adelphia Coliseum in Nashville, Tennessee. After the Bills had taken a 16–15 lead on a field goal with 16 seconds remaining in the game, on the ensuing kickoff return, Titans tight end Frank Wycheck threw a lateral pass across the field to Kevin Dyson, who then ran 75 yards to score the winning touchdown to earn a 22–16 victory.

Pregame info

Rob Johnson / Doug Flutie controversy
Going into the game, Bills coach Wade Phillips created a stir by starting quarterback Rob Johnson, rather than Doug Flutie, who had started 15 games and led them into the playoffs by winning ten games.

Prior to the 1998 season, Buffalo acquired Johnson in a trade, and he was expected to become the primary quarterback for the Bills. However, the Bills also signed former CFL star Doug Flutie after A.J. Smith, their Director of Pro Personnel, heavily valued his talents. Johnson, however, managed only a 1–3 start before being injured in Week 6 at Indianapolis. Flutie took over in relief, and not only led the Bills to a come-from-behind win, but earned the starting job. Going 7–3 as the starter, Flutie led the Bills to a 10–6 record in 1998, and a wild card berth.

In 1999, Flutie's stats were down with 19 touchdowns against 16 interceptions, but he went 10–5 as a starter and led the Bills to a second consecutive wild card berth. Going into the final week of the regular season, the Bills were assured of the fifth playoff seed in the AFC and knew they would be playing on the road against the runner-up of the AFC Central. The winner of that division was still to be determined between Jacksonville and Tennessee. In any case, the Bills could neither overtake the Colts for the AFC East title, nor the Jaguars or Titans for a home game in the wild card round.

With their playoff berth locked in, and the identity of their first round opponent beyond their control, Wade Phillips rested Flutie. He had Johnson start the Week 17 game against the Colts. Johnson played well in Flutie's place, going 24–of–32 for 287 yards and 2 touchdowns with no interceptions in a 31–6 win. The lopsided result shocked many fans, especially since while the Bills essentially had nothing to play for, the Colts (with a victory) were mathematically alive for the top seed in the AFC. Meanwhile, the Titans and Jaguars both won their final games, giving Jacksonville the division title and setting up a wild card round matchup between Buffalo and Tennessee.

The following day, Phillips told Johnson he would start in their first round playoff game against the Titans. Years later, Phillips claimed that it was not his decision to start Rob Johnson, and that owner Ralph Wilson had ordered him to do so. It remains unknown why the Bills started Johnson, but it is possible that the investments the Bills had spent on the players played a key role. While Flutie was a low-cost signing for the Bills, Johnson was being paid $25 million over four years with the expectation that he become the Bills' franchise quarterback. As a result, Wilson may have wanted to see a return on his investment.

On paper, Rob Johnson appeared to be a better choice. At 6'-5", he was a much more ideal height for a quarterback than the 5'-9" Doug Flutie. Johnson also possessed a stronger arm than Flutie, and like Flutie, could make plays on his feet as well as with his arm. However, Johnson also held onto the ball for an abnormally long amount of time when dropping back to pass. This resulted in him taking a considerable number of sacks, and with these sacks he was injury-prone.

Virtually all parties were shocked upon hearing the news that Johnson would start ahead of Flutie, and most of the Bills players reacted negatively to the decision. Many of them expressed bafflement that the quarterback who led their team to the playoffs would not start, while receiver Eric Moulds expressed disappointment because he felt he had established a great rapport with Flutie and having a different starting quarterback would take away from that. Other football media outlets also considered the decision to start Johnson over Flutie a bad move. On the statistical website Football Outsiders, Aaron Schatz routinely labeled the decision to start Johnson over Flutie as the worst coaching decision in NFL history.

Expectations

Many fans and media outlets had high expectations for this game.  Even though it was only a Wild Card game and the first playoff game of the weekend, it was believed that both teams in the contest were better than their playoff seedings indicated.  The Bills, who finished at 11–5, possessed the league's #1 defense in yards allowed, holding their opponents to just 252.8 yards per game.  Meanwhile, at 13–3, the Titans had the best record of a non-Division winner in NFL history.  As a result, it was believed that whoever won the game would be a serious contender to represent the AFC in the Super Bowl.

Previous meetings

Previously, the two teams had met in the playoffs in the 1993 divisional round when the Titans were the Houston Oilers. The game at Rich Stadium in Buffalo became known as The Comeback after the Bills came back trailing from a 35-3 deficit to win 41-38 in overtime. Until 2022, it remained the largest comeback in NFL history.

Game details

While the Bills-Titans Wild Card game is best known for its conclusion, the game was, first and foremost, a defensive battle.  Both teams struggled to move the ball as the Bills outgained the Titans in total yardage by a margin of 219–194.  Rob Johnson completed less than half his passes, while Steve McNair was held to just 76 yards passing.

First half
After a scoreless first quarter, the Titans opened up the scoring when Jevon Kearse sacked Buffalo quarterback Rob Johnson in the end zone for a safety. Johnson completed just 10 of 22 passes while being sacked 6 times, including twice by Kearse. Wide receiver Derrick Mason returned the free kick 42 yards to the Bills' 28-yard line; five plays later, Tennessee quarterback Steve McNair scored on a 1-yard touchdown run. After forcing a punt, the Titans drove 56 yards in 11 plays. Kicker Al Del Greco initially missed a 45-yard field goal attempt, but the Bills were penalized for defensive holding on the play and Del Greco's second attempt was good from 40 yards on the last play of the half. At the end of the half, the Bills were trailing 12–0 and had gained only 64 yards, while also losing 44 yards on 9 penalties.

Second half
In the second half, the Bills rallied. On Buffalo's first play of the third quarter, Antowain Smith broke off a 44-yard run, sparking a 62-yard drive that ended with his 4-yard touchdown run 4 plays later. Later on, the Bills drove 65 yards, featuring a 37-yard completion from Johnson to Eric Moulds, with a roughing the passer penalty on Kearse adding another 15. Smith finished the drive with another 4-yard touchdown run, giving the Bills a 13–12 lead after receiver Kevin Williams dropped a pass from Johnson on the two-point conversion attempt.

Conclusion

Late in the fourth quarter, the stage was set for an exciting finish. Tennessee received the ball with 6:15 remaining. Titans receiver Isaac Byrd's 16-yard punt return gave the Titans good field position at the Bills' 45-yard line.  On the second play of the drive, the Titans got a break when a Steve McNair pass bounced off linebacker John Holecek's arm and into the hands of Frank Wycheck for a completion.  Five carries from Eddie George for 17 yards set up a wobbly 36-yard field goal by Al Del Greco, giving the Titans a 15–13 lead with 1:48 to go.  Throughout the game, the Bills' defense faced myriad injuries.  As a result, by this point in the game they were exhausted and losing composure on the field.  The situation became so dire that Holecek burned a timeout without his coaches' approval.  As a result of this timeout and another one called before Del Greco's field goal attempt, the Bills would get the ball back with no timeouts. 

On the ensuing drive, Bills quarterback Rob Johnson led a 5-play, 37-yard drive to the Titans' 24-yard line.  It started after Del Greco's field goal for Tennessee, with Kevin Williams returning the ensuing kickoff 33 yards to give the Bills good field position at their own 39 yard line.  Johnson began the drive with a completion to rookie wide receiver Peerless Price for 14 yards and a first down.  After an incomplete pass, the Bills ran a draw play on second down, and running back Jonathan Linton picked up a 12 yard gain for another first down at the Titans' 35 yard line with less than a minute remaining.  On the next play from scrimmage, Johnson lost a shoe in a scramble, and with the clock running, he had no time to put it back on.  With only one shoe, Johnson rolled out and hit Price on an out pattern, and he broke a tackle and got out of bounds at the 24 yard line with 20 seconds left.  After this play, Wade Phillips sent out the field goal unit for what appeared to be a game-winning attempt.  Special Teams Coordinator Bruce DeHaven wanted the Bills to run another play so the Bills could kick the field goal with less time on the clock, but was overruled.  With only 16 seconds remaining in the game, Bills kicker Steve Christie, who had made the deciding field goal in overtime to cap the Bills' comeback when the teams had met in the 1992 wild card round, made a 41-yard kick to put Buffalo in the lead 16–15.

The play

The play was named "Home Run Throwback" by the Titans and was developed by special-teams coordinator Alan Lowry.  He had learned the play in 1982 as a member of the Dallas Cowboys coaching staff, watching Southern Methodist University execute a similar kickoff return to score the winning touchdown in the last seconds of its game at Texas Tech University. The Titans ran the play regularly in practices during the regular season, though the practices usually involved starting kick returner Derrick Mason, who had been injured earlier in the game and was unavailable for the situation.  The number 2 option for the play, Anthony Dorsett, was also unavailable for the play due to cramps.  As a result, the Titans put in wide receiver Isaac Byrd as their main option to retrieve the lateral pass, with Kevin Dyson put in as a trailer.  Dyson, as one of the team's lead wide receivers, rarely practiced with the special-teams unit and was mostly unfamiliar with the layout of the play.  As a result, head coach Jeff Fisher pulled him over before the play and gave him a brief rundown of what to do and what to expect on the play.  Nevertheless, his execution of Lowry's vision would be flawless.

Finding a player to throw the lateral pass was easier.  Frank Wycheck was discovered one day by offensive coordinator Les Steckel playing a throwing game with lineman Bruce Matthews entitled "Reindeer Games," which they invented to play while the two were bored at practice.  Steckel then designed an option pass play with Wycheck in mind.  When the team ran the play against the Atlanta Falcons in the 1999 season, Wycheck threw a 61-yard touchdown pass.  After the success of this play, Alan Lowry assigned Wycheck to throw the play's lateral.

Meanwhile, because the Bills had so many injuries by this point, the coaches asked for volunteers to cover the kickoff.  As a result, numerous regular defensive starters, including outside linebacker Sam Rogers, were in the game to cover the kickoff.  This gave the Bills' special teams unit players with more NFL experience than the average special teams unit, but because many of the Bills covering the kick were not regular special teams players, it also gave the Bills a particular disadvantage in terms of actual special teams experience.  Initially, the Bills planned on kicking the ball deep, but then Bruce DeHaven suggested that the Bills attempt a pooch, or bloop kick, where the ball goes higher and shorter than a regular kickoff to limit the opportunity for a runback.  This added a unique twist to the play.  When practicing the "Home Run Throwback," the Titans always practiced against a regular kickoff or a squib kick.  Thus, they would be forced to improvise with what they knew about the play's execution.  And that improvisation was decisive in the success of the play.

As DeHaven suggested, Steve Christie kicked a high and short pooch that was fielded by Lorenzo Neal. Neal handed the ball to Wycheck, who had been behind him and nearly ran into him. This formed the key shift in the play: The Bills chased Wycheck to the right side of the field, breaking their lanes in the process. 

As devised, Wycheck then threw the ball across the field where Dyson was positioned. As he caught the ball, the momentum of the play abruptly went to the left and caught every Bills defender except for Christie out of position. Dyson thus had an open path in front of him and ran seventy-five yards into the end zone for the go-ahead touchdown.

The play was not official yet, however. The replay officials in the booth notified referee Phil Luckett that they wanted him to review the play to see if Wycheck's throw had been a lateral, as had been called. If not, the Titans would have been penalized for an illegal forward pass at the spot of the throw and the touchdown would not count. Fans watching were getting impatient and nervous while the refs were making up their mind. Luckett upheld the call, and the Titans were victorious.

Upon crossing midfield, Dyson later said he considered going out of bounds in field goal range, as all the Titans needed was a field goal to win the game.  However, upon seeing that the only player with a shot at him was Christie and realizing that he was blocked by two players anyway, he simply kept going.

Officials 
Referee: Phil Luckett (#59)
Umpire: Bob Wagner (#100)
Head Linesman: Mark Hittner (#28)
Line Judge: Byron Boston (#18)
Field Judge: Al Jury (#106)
Side Judge: Tommy Moore (#60)
Back Judge: Kirk Dornan (#6)

Aftermath

Immediate
The victory, in front of a franchise-record crowd at Adelphia Coliseum, advanced the Titans to the AFC divisional round for the first time since 1993, when they were still based in Houston. Subsequent victories over the Indianapolis Colts and the Jacksonville Jaguars sent the Titans to Super Bowl XXXIV to face the St. Louis Rams, in which they lost by a touchdown in another game that went down to the final seconds, known as "One Yard Short" or "The Tackle."

For the Bills, the debacle led to the firing of special-teams coach Bruce DeHaven, who had been with the team for 13 seasons. (DeHaven was eventually rehired by the Bills into the same position for three seasons beginning in 2010.) DeHaven's replacement, Ronnie Jones, did not perform well.  In 2000, the Bills had one of the worst special teams units in NFL history, and it completely neutralized their #9 offense and #3 defense with the team going 8–8.  After the 2000 season, Phillips was fired, having failed to lead the Bills past the first round of the playoffs during his tenure. Phillips was replaced by Titans defensive coordinator Gregg Williams.

Long-term effect on the Bills
The Music City Miracle was added to the list of infamous moments in Buffalo sports history, joining "Wide Right", "No Goal", and the later "13 Seconds". It marked the start of a long playoff drought, as the Bills would go on to miss the playoffs for 17 straight years, eventually earning the longest active playoff drought in the NFL. Although Buffalo finally qualified again in the 2017 season (the playoff game in question then taking place in 2018), the Bills did not win another playoff game until Saturday, January 9, 2021. It would also mark the last game in a Bills uniform for its last remaining key members of its 1990s Super Bowl runs, as Bruce Smith, Thurman Thomas, and Andre Reed would all leave the team in the offseason due to salary cap constraints; all three of them alongside Jim Kelly and Marv Levy (both of whom were already retired prior to the 1999 season) are now members of the Pro Football Hall of Fame.

Although the Bills had lost four consecutive Super Bowls before this game, many Bills fans consider this game to be their single most humiliating loss in franchise history, due to the more surreal and controversial ending as well as the long-term impact the game had on the team.  Bills fans generally refuse to call this game and climactic play by its standard "Music City Miracle" name, and instead have taken to calling it more insulting names, most popularly "The Forward Lateral" and "The Immaculate Deception."  In his 2017 autobiography Son of Bum, Bills coach Wade Phillips called the play "The Music City Mistake." 

The drought eventually came to be called "the Curse of (Doug) Flutie." As the Bills' slump wore on, rumors circulated around upstate New York that Flutie's father Richard Flutie had become so enraged after learning his son had been benched on Ralph Wilson's orders that he swore the Bills would not make the playoffs again in his lifetime and/or that of the Bills' owner. Either way, such a "curse" would have held — Wilson died on March 25, 2014 while Doug Flutie's parents both died of natural causes on November 21, 2015. Within months of Wilson's death, the team was sold by his estate to Terry and Kim Pegula. The Bills' playoff drought finally came to an end three years after the Pegulas assumed ownership of the franchise.

Legacy
NFL Films hired a computer analyst to determine whether Luckett had made the correct call. After taking a closer look, it was determined that the ball indeed did not travel forward and that Luckett had made the correct ruling.

Due to the massive amount of interest the game received as a result of its climactic play, the NFL scheduled a rematch between the Titans and Bills as the opening Sunday Night game of the 2000 NFL season. The Bills won this time, 16–13. However, the Titans would get the last laugh as they finished the season with the NFL's best record at 13–3 while the Bills finished 8–8 and missed the postseason. The Bills wouldn't defeat the Titans again until 2015 — 16 years after the Music City Miracle — with a 14–13 win. 

During the NFL's centennial season in 2019, the Bills–Titans matchup in Week 5 was designated as one of 16 weekly games commemorating notable events in NFL history, namely the Music City Miracle. However, in a reversal of luck, the Titans were denied a go-ahead touchdown in the fourth quarter after it was determined that Titans quarterback Marcus Mariota crossed the line of scrimmage prior to making a forward pass to the end zone. The subsequent penalty loomed large as Titans kicker Cairo Santos missed the resulting field goal attempt, and Buffalo scored the game-winning touchdown on the ensuing drive. Santos was released shortly after.

After corralling a punt, Titans returner Chester Rogers threw the ball to teammate Chris Jackson, who advanced the ball 22 yards before being tackled. However, Rogers' pass visibly advanced 5 yards downfield, drawing an illegal forward pass penalty. This led to mockery from the Buffalo media and other Bills supporters.

See also 
The Play (American football)
2007 Trinity vs. Millsaps football game 
River City Relay
Miracle in Miami
Bills–Titans rivalry

References

Music City Miracle gives Titans win over Bills (December 20, 2000)
Game Details at Pro Football Reference
AFC Wild Card Playoff Game (2000, January 8). In Tennessee Titans Official Website

Tennessee Titans postseason
Buffalo Bills postseason
1999 National Football League season
National Football League playoff games
American football incidents
2000 in sports in Tennessee
21st century in Nashville, Tennessee
National Football League controversies
January 2000 sports events in the United States
Nicknamed sporting events